The Standups is an American comedy streaming television series. The series is a collection of 30-minute recordings of stand-up comedians, compiled and released by Netflix. The comedians featured in the series are generally less well-known than comics who have stand-alone specials. The first season premiered on July 4, 2017 and was followed up by a second season on March 20, 2018. In July 2021, Netflix renewed the series for a third season which premiered on December 29, 2021.

Episodes

Series overview

Season 1 (2017)

Season 2 (2018)

Season 3 (2021)

References

External links
 
 

2017 American television series debuts
2010s American stand-up comedy television series
English-language Netflix original programming
Television shows filmed in Los Angeles
Television shows set in Los Angeles